Raghav Raj Bhatt is a renowned Kathak dancer, sketch artist and folk and tribal arts expert. He is the prime disciple of Padma Vibhushan Pt Birju Maharaj Ji. His solo, duet and group productions have been staged at numerous prestigious festivals in India and abroad.

Early life 
Raghav was born in Hyderabad to Dr Gopal Raj Bhatt, a folk and tribal art revivalist and Vijaya, a home maker.

Personal life 
Raghav is married to Kathak danseuse, choreographer Mangala Bhatt, who is the senior disciple of Pt Durga Lal Ji. They perform together and continue to take their passion for arts forward through their learning centre - Aakruti Kathak Kendra. They live in Hyderabad, India.

Career 

Raghav was selected on a national scholarship to learn from Padma Vibhushan Pt Birju Maharaj Ji. Encouraged by his father, he moved to Delhi to train at Kathak Kendra under the aegis of Maharaj Ji. After completing his Visharad in Kathak, Raghav excelled as a dancer, performing in almost all of his major dance drama and classical productions in India and abroad.

Taking inspiration from his father, Raghav also is closely involved with folk & tribal arts projects. His efforts have been recognised by numerous institutions and government bodies such as Sangeet Natak Akademi, Centre for Cultural Resources and Training, Indian Council for Cultural Relations, Ministry of Culture, Department of Language & Culture, Govt of Telangana, etc.

Mangala Bhatt & Raghav Raj Bhatt  have received numerous honours for their contribution to classical dance, art and culture. They were conferred the State Award by Chief Minister K Chrandrasekhar Rao and more recently they also received the 13th Guru Deba Prasad Award.

As of 2020, Raghav Raj Bhatt is the Principal of the ST Govt College of Music and Dance.

Books 
Ang Kavya by Pt Birju Maharaj - credited for his sketches.

See also 

 Pt Birju Maharaj Ji
 Pt Durga Lal Ji
 Kathak
 Mangala Bhatt
 List of Kathak Exponents
 Sangeet Natak Akademi

References 

21st-century Indian dancers
Indian male dancers
21st-century Indian artists
Recipients of the Sangeet Natak Akademi Award
Kathak exponents